Marsh Creek is a  long tributary to Crabtree Creek in Wake County, North Carolina and is classed as a 2nd order stream on the EPA waters geoviewer site.

Course
Marsh Creek rises in northeastern Raleigh then flows southeast through the eastern parts Raleigh, NC to meet Crabtree Creek near the US 64 and I-440 interchange.  About 6% of the watershed is forested and most of the watershed is developed.

Watershed
Marsh Creek drains  of area that is underlaid by Raleigh Gneiss geology.  The watershed receives an average of 46.6 in/year of precipitation and has a wetness index of 451.60.

See also
List of rivers of North Carolina

External links
 Brentwood Park (City of Raleigh)
 Article on Marsh Creek from Raleigh Naturalist
 USGS gauge on Marsh Creek near New Hope

References

Rivers of North Carolina
Rivers of Wake County, North Carolina
Tributaries of Pamlico Sound